Edwin Bryant Crocker (26 April 1818 – 24 June 1875) was a California Supreme Court Justice and founder of the Crocker Art Museum in Sacramento, California.

Biography
Crocker was born in Jamesville, New York to Isaac and Elizabeth Crocker. He earned a degree in civil engineering at Rensselaer Institute in Troy, New York. He went on to read law in South Bend, Indiana. While there, he started a practice that earned him a reputation as an abolitionist. In June 1850, Crocker lost a civil case brought by a slave owner for helping four slaves escaping from Kentucky. In July 1850, Crocker attended the Liberty Party convention in Syracuse, New York, where he retold the story of helping the slaves. In June 1851, he spoke at the Christian Anti-Slavery State convention in Indianapolis, Indiana. In August 1852, he was named a delegate from Indiana to the Free Soil Party convention. In 1852, he and his second wife moved to Sacramento, California.

When they arrived in Sacramento, Crocker resumed his legal career. He was also involved in politics. On March 8, 1856, he chaired the state's first meeting of the Republican Party. In 1863, Governor Leland Stanford appointed Crocker as an associate justice of the California Supreme Court, which position he held from May 21, 1863, to January 2, 1864. In 1863, elections were held for all seats on the Supreme Court due to an 1862 amendment to California constitution and 1863 enabling law, and Crocker chose to step down rather than seek re-election.

The next year, Crocker agreed to serve as legal counsel for the Central Pacific Railroad, a company run by the Big Four, which included Edwin's younger brother, Charles Crocker. Crocker served as the Central Pacific's attorney during the building of the First transcontinental railroad, culminating in the ceremony for the driving of the golden spike at Promontory, Utah, on May 10, 1869.

The stress of all of his work took a toll on Crocker. He suffered from a stroke in June 1869. He retired from his other pursuits and took up less stressful hobbies. With a net worth of a million dollars from railroad investments, Crocker and his family traveled throughout Europe and collected art. His family renovated their home to include an art gallery. Their home and the art that they had acquired would eventually become the Crocker Art Museum.

After his stroke, Crocker's health never fully recovered. On June 24, 1875, he died in Sacramento. He is interred in the Sacramento Historic City Cemetery in Sacramento, California.

Personal life
On September 3, 1845, Crocker married Mary Norton in Mishawaka, Indiana. She died on April 12, 1847, in South Bend, Indiana. They had a daughter, also named Mary.
On July 8, 1852, he remarried to Margaret Rhodes in New York in a ceremony performed by Henry Ward Beecher. They had four daughters: Aimée Crocker, Jennie Louise Crocker Fassett, Nellie Margaret and Kate Eugenie Gunn, and two sons Edwin Clark, who died as a baby, and Elwood Bender, a relative who they adopted.

Family tree

See also

 List of justices of the Supreme Court of California
 Warner Cope
 Edward Norton

References

External links

 Edwin Crocker Family papers, 1885-1936.
 
 Past & Present Justices. California State Courts. Retrieved July 19, 2017.
 Portrait of Edwin B. Crocker. Calisphere.org.

1818 births
1875 deaths
Businesspeople from California
Politicians from Sacramento, California
American art collectors
Rensselaer Polytechnic Institute alumni
U.S. state supreme court judges admitted to the practice of law by reading law
Justices of the Supreme Court of California
Lawyers from Sacramento, California
California Republicans
Indiana Free Soilers
American abolitionists
People from DeWitt, New York
Activists from New York (state)
Activists from California
19th-century American judges
Crocker family
19th-century American businesspeople
19th-century American lawyers